Click is a 2006 American comedy film directed by Frank Coraci, written by Steve Koren and Mark O'Keefe, and produced by Adam Sandler, who also stars. Sandler plays Michael Newman, a workaholic family man who acquires a magical universal remote that enables him to control reality. The film co-stars Kate Beckinsale as his wife Donna and Christopher Walken as Morty, the eccentric stranger who gives Michael the remote.

Filming began in late 2005 and was finished by early 2006. Click was released in the United States on June 23, 2006, by Columbia Pictures. It was made on a budget of $82.5million, and grossed $240.7million. Upon release, it received mixed reviews from critics, although it was nominated for Best Makeup at the 79th Academy Awards (it lost the award to Pan's Labyrinth). This makes Click the only Sandler-produced film (as of 2023) to be nominated for an Academy Award.

Plot

Michael Newman is an architect who is consistently bullied by his overbearing boss, John Ammer, and often chooses work over his wife Donna and his two children, Ben and Samantha. One night, Michael visits the retail store Bed Bath & Beyond to buy a universal remote control. He stumbles around the various departments before falling asleep. Upon waking, he accepts a free remote control from a man named Morty, who warns him that it can never be returned.

Michael learns that the remote can be used to control reality much like a television. He uses it to his advantage at work, to cause light-hearted mischief, and to fast-forward past illnesses. Morty tells Michael that during these times, his body is on "auto-pilot", going through his motions of everyday life while his mind skips ahead.

Thinking that Ammer has promoted him to a partnership, Michael buys bicycles for his children and a purse for Donna. However, Ammer tells him that he has not yet been promoted and thus cannot afford the gifts and has to return them. Angry that he upset his family, Michael uses the remote to skip ahead to his promotion, thus missing a year of his life. During this time, he and Donna have entered marriage counseling, his children have matured, and the family dog has died. The remote, having learned his preferences, starts time-skipping automatically. Each time Michael attempts to discard or destroy the remote, it reappears, and Morty refuses to take it back.

At work, Ammer tells Michael he plans on retiring, which would make Michael the new head of the International Division and that in time, Michael could be promoted to CEO. This causes the remote to instantly fast-forward ten years into the future, where Michael is extremely wealthy, but morbidly obese and lives alone in a luxury apartment. He returns home to discover that Ben, now overweight like himself, and Samantha have both become moody teenagers, and that Donna has divorced him and remarried to Bill, Ben's former childhood swim coach. When he argues with them, the new family dog jumps on Michael and knocks him into a coma. The remote time-skips six years to when Michael wakes, no longer obese as a result of having undergone liposuction to save his life as a part of his cancer treatment and subsequent heart attack. A full-grown Ben is now a partner at the firm and is also slim having exercised with Bill.

Michael learns that his father, Ted, has died of old age. Morty reappears as Michael mourns him. Michael uses the remote to see when he last saw Ted, when Michael coldly rebuffed Ted's offer to take him and Ben out to dinner. At Ted's grave, Morty appears and reveals to Michael that he is the Angel of Death. Overcome with guilt and shame, Michael asks to go to a "good place", whereupon the remote fast-forwards him several more years in the future to Ben's wedding. He overhears Samantha refer to Bill as Dad, triggering a second heart attack. He wakes in the hospital that night to find his family there, including Samantha, who clarifies that she views both Bill and Michael as her fathers. Ben reveals that he skipped his honeymoon to help fix issues with the firm before a nurse sends everyone away. Fearing that Ben will make the same mistakes he did, Michael gathers the last of his strength to follow him and Samantha out of the hospital, but he collapses and subsequently dies, but not before telling Ben to put his wife before work, and assures his family that he still loves them.
 
Michael reawakens in Bed Bath & Beyond and finds that he was dreaming but sees it as a sign that he needs to make changes in his life. He embraces his family and promises to spend more time with them. He finds the remote on the counter along with a note from Morty, who reveals he has given him a second chance because "Good guys need a break." Michael throws the remote in the trash and, much to his delight, it does not reappear. He then joins his family in a pillow fight.

Cast

Production
On July 23, 2003, Sony purchased Steve Koren and Mark O'Keefe's spec script Click for $1.75 million, with plans for it to be an Adam Sandler film produced by Revolution Studios, Columbia Pictures, and Neal H. Moritz's company Original Film; the purchase occurred as Bruce Almighty (2003), also written by Koren and O'Keefe, had grossed $236 million domestically in its two month run. Click was the second comedy Moritz produced for Columbia Pictures, after Not Another Teen Movie (2001). Although Sony planned filming to begin in April 2004 after Sandler finished shooting Spanglish (2004), that was postponed for Koren and O'Keefe to rewrite the script under the supervision of Juan José Campanella, who was announced as director in May 2004. However, he was replaced by Frank Coraci, who directed the Sandler films The Wedding Singer (1998) and The Waterboy (1998), in March 2005. Executive producer Tim Herlihy also revised the script. Christopher Walken joined the cast on February 23, 2005.

Imageworks began working on the film's digital effects in January 2006 without any research and development. While most of the effects were shot compositings, three-dimensional graphics were also made for the display on the remote and matte painting a few settings, such as the Bed and Beyond warehouse, a city background at Michael's workplace, and the winter backyard at his home; programs such as Cinema 4D and Autodesk Maya were used to produce the graphics. In order to make the fast-forwarding and rewinding look DVD-like, effects of interlaced video and scan lines "slicing through" were added. Motion control photography and green screen effects were used for scenes where Michael looked back on his life with the remote, meaning that were occasionally two Michaels in the same shot; while rotoscoping was used for the sequence where he changes the color of his face with the remote.

For scenes where Michael pauses his surroundings, the effects crew originally planned for everything to be frozen, including the environment; however, they found out this "bothered" the eye, thus switching the plan to only the characters being frozen while the environment (such as leaves on the trees being blown by wind) keeps in motion. The primary challenge for the freeze shots was sharpening the frozen characters as much as possible; there were some cases where the characters would freeze in a very active moment, causing the effects team to have to work with the motion blur that resulted from it. For instances where characters were frozen in a moment where they were still, they were filmed staying in that position for seconds so that, during post-production, the average of multiple frames would create a result absent of film grain.

Release and promotion 
Clicks official website debuted in late December 2005, consisting only of the film's official trailer; C.S. Strowbridge of The Numbers called the trailer "better than I expected. It seems like Adam Sandler is serious about maturing as an actor." Other interactive features and pages were added later on, such as a plot summary, image gallery, information about the cast and crew, audio and video clips, and a Control Your Universe poster generator.

The film screened out of competition at the San Sebastian International Film Festival. The film was released in the United States on June 23, 2006 and made its UK premiere in a London Empire Cinema on September 28, 2006.

Home media
Click was released on DVD, Blu-ray and UMD on October 10, 2006. It was the first dual layer Blu-ray disc released by Sony.

Reception

Box office

Domestic
Before Clicks theatrical run, Strowbridge predicted, on the basis of a weak critical reception and the commercial failure of a similar dramedy attempt of Sandler's, Spanglish, Click would be one of his lesser hits; however, he suggested it could still gross up to $125 million due to its mixture of comedy and drama elements. The weekend before the film's release, Nikki Finke projected an opening weekend gross of $40 million due to similarly-high numbers of prior Sony-produced Sandler comedies such as 50 First Dates (2004), Mr. Deeds (2002), and Anger Management (2003). The day before the film's theatrical start, Entertainment Weeklys Joshua Rich projected Click to have a $55 million opening weekend and a total overall gross of $210 million for its "broadly appealing" high concept and the inclusion of Adam Sandler and Kate Beckinsale in lead roles.

Domestically, Click opened in 3,749 theaters and debuted at number-one at the box office, grossing $14.5 million on its opening day and $40 million in its opening weekend; Sony distributed the film in a hugely successful year as it was their seventh number-one hit of 2006. Groups of viewers outside the young male demographic were also higher than previous Sandler films; Sony's exit polls showed 51% of attendees being female and 50% over the age of 25. Click was also one of the only three films to surpass a $10,000 theater average that weekend with $10,673; the other two were Wassup Rockers and Leonard Cohen: I'm Your Man, both of which played at one theater.

Strowbridge predicted that in its second weekend, Click would fall 50% and gross $20 million due to intense competition with Superman Returns. However, while Click grossed approximately that amount and got dethroned by the superhero film as expected by analysts, what wasn't anticipated was that The Devil Wears Prada would open with double the gross initially projected; as a result, The Devil Wears Prada made $27.5 million in three days and placed Click in the number-three spot.

During its third weekend, when the record-breaking Pirates of the Caribbean: Dead Man's Chest debuted, Click had the second-strongest hold of all competitors in the top five; it dropped only 40% from the prior weekend, while Pixar's Cars went down 38%, The Devil Wears Prada 47%, and  Superman Returns 60%; Click also surpassed the $100 million mark that weekend, making it the seventh Sandler film to gross that amount. It later grossed $137.4 million in the United States and $100.3 million internationally, with a total gross of $240.7 million worldwide.

International
Click opened on June 30, 2006 in Australia and New Zealand to the number-one spot in both countries; in Australia, it made $2.97 million from 281 theaters, in New Zealand $853,000 from 48. The following week, it went down 34% making $1.98 million in Australia while opening to six screens in Ireland with $59,000. By the fourth week of its international run, Click had grossed a total of $10.87 million and was running in four countries, $9.51 million of the total gross being from Australia. On the weekend of August 28, 2006, Click had a strong number-one debut in Mexico, grossing $1.76 million from 418 theaters, which helped launch the film into the international top ten, specifically number seven; it grossed $4.26 million from 1,159 screens in 22 nations, bringing the international total to $25.71 million. It went down to number nine the following weekend, grossing $3.47 million from 1,104 screens in 27 countries and increasing the total gross to $31.12 million.

Critical reception
Rotten Tomatoes gave Click a score of 34% based on 174 reviews. The average score is a 4.78/10, and the consensus is: "This latest Adam Sandler vehicle borrows shamelessly from It's a Wonderful Life and Back to the Future, and fails to produce the necessary laughs that would forgive such imitation." Metacritic gave it a score of 45 out of 100, based on 35 reviews, which indicates "mixed or average reviews". Audiences polled by CinemaScore gave the film an average grade of "B+" on an A+ to F scale.  Peter Bradshaw opined Click was an improvement over the previous Sandler flick Mr. Deeds (2002): "It has some moments of good-natured sweetness and Adam Sandler is improving as a comic performer, though he is still conceited and opaque."

The film was criticized for its gross-out humor and unlikeable protagonist. Entertainment Weekly critic Lisa Schwarzbaum wrote Click failed at being It's a Wonderful Life because "Michael earns none of George Bailey’s mature wisdom honestly."

When it came to positive reviews, Newsweek claimed Click was predictable as a moral story but "unusually dark, occasionally touching and pretty funny" for a Sandler comedy. Empires Sam Toy enjoyed the film for its "smart and genuinely moving ideas," Beckinsale's performance, and a strong third act, although dismissed the script for being overstuffed, the first half of the film for Sandler being too restrained in his everyman role, and actors such as Coolidge, Hasselhoff and Walken for being put in small roles.

Accolades
 79th Academy Awards: Best Makeup (Nominated)
 33rd People's Choice Awards: Favorite Movie Comedy (Won)
 2006 Teen Choice Awards: Choice Movie – Comedy (Nominated)
 2007 Kids' Choice Awards: Favorite Movie (Nominated)
 2007 Kids' Choice Awards: Favorite Movie Actor (Won)
 The Numbers: Weekly Website Award (Won)
 Variety: Adam Sandler’s 10 Worst Movies Ever (Unranked list)

References

External links

 
 
 
 

2006 films
American comedy-drama films
American science fiction films
American science fiction comedy films
Columbia Pictures films
2010s English-language films
Films directed by Frank Coraci
Films produced by Adam Sandler
Films produced by Neal H. Moritz
Films scored by Rupert Gregson-Williams
Films set in New York City
Films set in New Hampshire
Films set in the future
Films set in the 1960s
Films set in the 1970s
Films set in the 1980s
Films set in the 1990s
Films set in 2006
Films set in 2007
Films set in 2016
Films set in 2017
Films set in the 2000s
Films set in the 2010s
Films set in the 2020s
Films set in the 2030s
Time in fiction
Films about time travel
Happy Madison Productions films
Revolution Studios films
Original Film films
2000s American films